Nemanja Živković (born 24 January 1995) is a Serbian football left back who plays for Bosnian club FK Podrinje Janja.

Club career
Born in Belgrade, Živković started his senior career with Javor Ivanjica. Playing in the Serbian First League, he collected 7 matches and scored 1 goal during the 2014–15 season, and he was also loaned to Serbian League West side Železničar Lajkovac on dual registration during the same season. For the next season, Živković was loaned to Loznica, on dual registration. After a season he spent with Loznica, Živković left on new loan to Sloboda Užice for the first half of 2016–17 Serbian First League season. After the end of a contract with club, Živković left Javor in 2017.

Ahead of the 2019-20 season, Živković joined Bosnian First League of the Republika Srpska club FK Podrinje Janja.

Career statistics

References

External links
 Nemanja Živković stats at utakmica.rs 
 
 Nemanja Živković at Srbijafudbal

1995 births
Living people
Footballers from Belgrade
Association football midfielders
Serbian footballers
Serbian expatriate footballers
FK Javor Ivanjica players
FK Železničar Lajkovac players
FK Loznica players
FK Sloboda Užice players
FK Podrinje Janja players
Serbian First League players
First League of the Republika Srpska players
Serbian expatriate sportspeople in Bosnia and Herzegovina
Expatriate footballers in Bosnia and Herzegovina